Chloe Meave Orkin is a British physician and Professor of HIV/AIDS medicine at Queen Mary University of London. She works as a consultant at the Royal London Hospital, Barts Health NHS Trust. She is an internationally renowned expert in HIV therapeutics and led the first phase III clinical trial of injectable anti-retrovirals. She is immediate past Chair of the British HIV Association, where she championed the Undetectable=Untransmittable (U=U) campaign within the United Kingdom. She is president elect of the Medical Women's Federation. Orkin is  gay and was on the Top 100 Lesbian influencer lists in both the UK and in the US in 2020.  She considers herself a medical activist and much of her work focuses on inequalities in healthcare and in Medicine.

Early life and education 
Orkin was born in Johannesburg, South Africa. She obtained her medical degree in 1995 from the University of the Witwatersrand and was the prize student in virology and microbiology. She began her clinical training at Chris Hani Baragwanath Hospital, Soweto in the 1990s. At the time, between 30 and 40% of medical inpatients were infected with HIV and Orkin herself, lost close friends to AIDS. She moved to the United Kingdom. In 1998, she completed her specialist training in HIV and Genitourinary Medicine  at Chelsea and Westminster Hospital. Towards the end of her specialist training, Orkin moved to Botswana together with nurse colleague and partner Flick Thorley to establish an HIV/AIDS treatment programme in Francistown as part of the government anti-retroviral roll-out. In 2006, Orkin completed a MSc in Infectious Diseases from The London School of Hygiene & Tropical Medicine.

Research and career 
At the age of 29, Orkin was appointed as Consultant physician at Barts Health NHS Trust. Her specialist interests are the development of novel antiretroviral therapies, blood-borne virus testing and health inequalities. In 2013, she led the Test Me East HIV testing campaign which was supported by David Furnish, Sir Elton John and Sadie Frost and covered by CNN, Channel 4 and ITV news. In 2015, she spearheaded ‘Going Viral’, a week-long campaign to raise awareness of blood-borne viruses. The week-long novel campaign offered HIV, Hepatitis B and Hepatitis C testing in emergency departments around the United Kingdom utilising an opt-out testing strategy. The campaign was widely covered in the media and supported by several high profile celebrities, including actor Richard Wilson and DJ Tim Westwood. She led the first ever phase III clinical trial into the use of injectable anti-retrovirals. After appearing on ITV News to discuss the treatment, she was trolled on social media where many misogynistic and homophobic comments were made about her appearance and sexual identity. This experience led her to take action on gender and sexuality-based discrimination. Shortly after she stood for election and was elected Vice President of the Medical Women's Federation in 2019. Orkin has also served as Chair of the British HIV Association from 2017-2019 and is on the Governing Council for the International AIDS Society.

In 2018, Orkin and the British HIV Association announced their commitment to the Undetectable=Untransmittable (U=U) campaign.

During the first wave of COVID-19 pandemic in the United Kingdom, she led on safe delivery of COVID-19 treatment trials at the 5 Barts Health NHS Trust hospitals including NHS Nightingale London (the first non-hospital, non-military research delivery). Since then she has led the team that created a new clinical trial centre in a community library to deliver a large SARS CoV2 vaccine trials and was appointed as its clinical director. She has also led research into poor health outcomes in ethnically diverse people and on gender disparities in women's academic careers. She is lead investigator for the first COVID-19 vaccine trial in pregnant women.

Selected publications 

HIV Anti-retroviral Therapy:

 
 
 

COVID-19 Equality Research:

Blood-borne Virus Testing in UK Emergency Department:

Awards and honours 
Orkin is a Fellow of the Royal College of Physicians (FRCP).

Personal life 
Orkin is lesbian. She lives in London with her wife Flick Thorley, who was a highly regarded HIV specialist nurse at Chelsea and Westminster hospital and Charge Nurse at the London Lighthouse. They share a home with their three dogs and two cats.

References 

Living people
Year of birth missing (living people)
British women medical doctors
British LGBT scientists
LGBT physicians
People from Johannesburg
University of the Witwatersrand alumni
Academics of Queen Mary University of London
21st-century LGBT people